Alcalá or Alcala is a Spanish surname. Alcalá (Spanish), Alcalà (Catalan), Alcala and the derivative Arcala are all ultimately derived (typically through placenames) from the Arabic word al-qalʿah (القلعة), meaning "the citadel" or "fortification".

Alcalá
Notable people with the surname Alcalá include:
 Blanca Alcalá (born 1961), Mexican politician
 Félix Enríquez Alcalá (born 1951), American television and movie director, cinematographer and producer
 Jorge Alcalá (born 1995), Dominican baseball player
 Kathleen Alcalá (born 1954), American author
 Luis Espinosa Alcalá (1932–2009), Mexican poet, songwriter, and music promoter
 Macedonio Alcalá (1831–1869), Mexican violinist, pianist and songwriter
 Niceto Alcalá-Zamora, president of Spain, 1931-36
 Raúl Alcalá (born 1964), Mexican road racing cyclist

Alcala
Notable people with the surname Alcala include:
 Alfredo Alcala (1925–2000), Filipino comic book artist
 Dora Alcala, American politician
 Joshua Alcala (born 1984), American footballer
 Larry Alcala (1926–2002), Philippine cartoonist and illustrator
 Nilo Alcala (born 1978), Philippine composer and chorister
 Rodney Alcala (1943–2021), American rapist and serial killer
 Santo Alcala (born 1952), Dominican baseball player

See also 
 Alcalá (disambiguation)
 Alcalá-Galiano
 Alcalá-Zamora
 Alkalai (the Hebrew version of the name, found among Sephardic Jews)

References

External links
 Alcala

Spanish-language surnames
Toponymic surnames